Quaid may refer to:

 Quaid (surname), including a list of people with the name
 Quaid Road, a stretch of road in Queensland, Australia
 Quaid Software, a Canadian software company
 Quaid (quizzy), Also known as Spicy Quaid, or by friends “Kizzy”, “Quasi”, and “Whizzy”. He is a Youtuber with close to 100 subscribers on youtube. Whizzy is known for having some of the hardest images on the face of the earth. His rise to fame comes from his natural charisma and humor.

See also